Crime in Serbia is combated by the Serbian police and other government agencies.

Crime by type

Murder 

In 2012, Serbia had a murder rate of 1.2 per 100,000 population. There were a total of 111 murders in Serbia in 2012.

Organised crime 

Serbian Organised Crime ( / Srpska Mafija, Serbian Mafia) are various criminal organisations based in Serbia or composed of ethnic Serbs. Serbian criminals are active in the European Union (EU) countries. The organisations are primarily involved in smuggling, arms trafficking, drug trafficking, protection racket, illegal gambling, jewelry and gems theft, bodyguarding, and contract killing. The Mafia is composed of several major organised groups, which in turn have wider networks throughout primarily Europe.

The Yugoslav Wars prompted criminals a "way out" of economic disaster during the international imposed sanctions against Serbia. Serbian criminals have been recruited to state security forces, a notable example is Legija, a commander in the Arkan's Tigers which after the war was re-labeled as the JSO (Red Berets), he allegedly planned the murder of Prime Minister Zoran Đinđić.

Corruption 

Corruption levels are perceived to be high by surveyed residents of Serbia, and public trust in key institutions remains low.

Public procurement, public administration recruitment processes, mining and rail operations are sectors with a serious problem of conflict of interest. The European Commission has raised concern over Serbia's judiciary, police, health and education sectors that are particularly vulnerable to corruption. Transparency Serbia estimated in September 2016 that at least 374,000 cases of "petty corruption" in public services remain undiscovered every year.

Piracy 
Piracy in Serbia is increasing in intensity in 2000s and 2010s. Especially threatened is the shipping on the part of Danube between Belgrade and Smederevo. Most commonly, pirates will plunder bulk cargo such as oil, coke, metals, grains, sugar or fertilizers, but sometimes also remove cables and electric motors from the ships.

The confrontations of the pirates with the crews rarely escalate, with a single shipman murder recorded, in late-2000s. This is, in part, because crews will often cooperate with the pirates, sell part of the cargo, then report the piracy to receive insurance money. Cases of cooperation of the pirates with the police have also been recorded.

The pirates will also often engage in smuggling fuel and other goods across Danube.

False bomb threats 
False bomb threats are relatively common in Serbia. Since the police reacts to every bomb threat by searching the entire buildings for the possible bomb, most common targets are schools where students will phone in a threat to delay their exams, and courts where people expecting to lose a trial will phone in to delay it. Due to false bomb threats, the building of the High Court in Belgrade had to be evacuated more than 70 times in 2008

Less common targets include those as diverse as Belgrade firefighters' headquarters, a residential building or Kraljevo public library.

Frequency of the false bomb threats was reduced in 2009, after a new law specified harsher, triplified, punishments.

Crime dynamics
Serbian law enforcement authorities have prioritised fighting drug trafficking, terrorism and organised crime during the late 2000s.

References